Wang Wenhua (born on 17 December 1967), also known as Tom Wang, is a contemporary Taiwanese novelist and columnist. He graduated from the Department of Foreign Languages and Literatures at National Taiwan University, and obtained an MBA from Stanford University. He is the author of Protein Girls and 61 vs 57. Wang Wenhua has a background in marketing and his novels chronicle the lives of yuppies in Taipei.

References

1967 births
Living people
National Taiwan University alumni
Taiwanese male novelists
Stanford Graduate School of Business alumni